Charles Lacey (July 3, 1906 – October 8, 1957) was a professional golfer who had a number of high finishes in major championships in the 1930s. Lacey won born in England but emigrated to the United States aged 20 and spent the rest of his career there.

Early life
Lacey was the son of Arthur Lacey, the greenkeeper at Burnham Beeches Golf Club in Buckinghamshire. Arthur was also a golfer, winning the first competition of the Golf Greenkeepers' Association at Bushey Hall Golf Club in 1912 with scores of 80 and 79. Arthur later moved to Ifield, West Sussex. Lacey had an older brother Arthur junior who was also a successful golfer.

Golf career
Lacey emigrated to the United States in late 1926.

He spent part of the winters of 1933/34 and 1936/37 in England and played a number of exhibition matches, including some with his brother Arthur.

Tournament wins

PGA Tour wins
1936 Long Island Open

Other wins
this list may be incomplete
1935 Long Island PGA Championship

Results in major championships

NYF = tournament not yet founded
NT = no tournament
CUT = missed the half-way cut
WD = withdrew
"T" indicates a tie for a place

References

English male golfers
English emigrants to the United States
People from Burnham, Buckinghamshire
1906 births
1957 deaths